KATF (92.9 FM) is a radio station broadcasting an adult contemporary format. Licensed to serve the Dubuque, Iowa, United States, area, the station is currently owned by Radio Dubuque, Inc., and features programming from Fox News Radio. Its transmitter is located across the Mississippi River from the northern part of downtown Dubuque in southwestern Grant County, Wisconsin. KATF formerly had the call letters KFMD.

Includes Katfm in the morning with Lisa Bennett, midday's with Misty Woolf and afternoons with Mike Field.

Radio Dubuque also hosts the Dubuque, Iowa 4th of July celebration, and many local events such as: Chili-cookoffs, outdoor concerts, and live broadcasts.

KATF is the most powerful radio station in the Dubuque market and while all Dubuque radio stations cover the tri-states of Iowa, Illinois, and Wisconsin, KATF's signal can also be heard in the far southeastern corner of Minnesota, thereby adding a fourth state to the fringes of the FM station's coverage area.

References

External links
Radio Dubuque Radio Stations

ATF
Mainstream adult contemporary radio stations in the United States
Mass media in Dubuque, Iowa
Radio stations established in 1967
1967 establishments in Iowa